Jozef Hanák (born 8 August 1976) is a Slovak football goalkeeper.

References

External links
 Futbalnet profile (Slovak)

1976 births
Living people
Slovak footballers
Association football goalkeepers
FK Dukla Banská Bystrica players
FK Železiarne Podbrezová players
Slovak Super Liga players
People from Lučenec
Sportspeople from the Banská Bystrica Region